The 2021 season for the  team was its thirteen season as a UCI WorldTeam and its nineteenth overall. For this season, Japanese construction company Nippo Corporation, which had sponsored French UCI ProTeam  last season, joined the team as a co-title sponsor, as did several of the French team's riders.

Team roster 

Riders who joined the team for the 2021 season

Riders who left the team during or after the 2020 season

Season victories

National, Continental, and World Champions

References

External links 
 

2021
EF Education–Nippo
EF Education–Nippo